André Fenley (often spelled Andre Fenley) is an American supervising sound editor, foley editor, first Assistant Sound Editor, sound designer, dialogue editor, sound designer and assistant director, film editor from San Francisco, California who spent much of his career sound editing at Skywalker Sound. As a sound editor, his credits include Iron Man, Minority Report, The Lion King, The Jungle Book, Fight Club and Jurassic Park.

Filmography

1990s 

 Jurassic Park (1993) 
 The Meteor Man (1993)
 Baby's Day Out (1994)
 Quiz Show (1994)
 Miracle on 34th Street (1994)
 Casper (1995)
 Nine Months (1995)
 Strange Days (1995)
 Jumanji (1995)
 The Arrival (1996)
 Mars Attacks! (1996)
 Boys Night Out (Short) (1996)
 B*A*P*S (1996)
 The Lost World: Jurassic Park (1997)
 Saving Private Ryan (1998)
 Halloween H20: 20 Years Later (1998)
 Dogma (1999)
 Fight Club (1999)

2000s 

  The Prophecy 3: The Ascent (Video) (2000)
  Dinosaur (2000)
  The Legend of Bagger Vance (2000)
  Wes Craven Presents: Dracula 2000 (2000)
 A.I. Artificial Intelligence (2001)
 Lilo & Stitch (2002)
 Minority Report (2002)
 Hulk (2003)
 Peter Pan (2003)
 Shrek 2 (2004)
 Catwoman (2004)
 Lorelei: The Witch of the Pacific Ocean (2005)
 xXx: State of the Union (2005)
 Rent (2005)
 Munich (2005)
 Lady in the Water (2006)
 Zodiac (2006)
 The Kite Runner (2007)
 Lions for Lambs (2007)
 Iron Man (2008)
 Bolt (2008)
 My Bloody Valentine (2009)
 Ice Age: Dawn of the Dinosaurs (2009)
 Waking Sleeping Beauty (Documentary) (2009)

2010s 

 Fanny, Annie & Danny (2010)
 Iron Man 2 (2010)
 The Conspirator (2010)
 Cowboys & Aliens (2011)
 Mission: Impossible Ghost Protocol (2011)
 Wreck-It Ralph (2012)
 Epic (2013)
 All Is Lost (2013)
 A Bit of Bad Luck (2014)
 How to Train Your Dragon 2 (2014)
 Maleficent (2014)
 A Most Violent Year (2014)
 Avengers: Age of Ultron (2015)
 The Other Kids (2016)
 The Jungle Book (2016)
 Kong: Skull Island (2017)
 Only the Brave (2017)
 A Wrinkle in Time (2019)
 It's Snowing Outside (Short) (2019)
 'Til Death (Short) (2019)
 The Lion King (2019)

2020s 

 Dolittle (2020)
 Second Team (Short) (2020)
 Green Cobra (Short) (2020)
 Canvas (Short) (2020)
 West Side Story (2021)

As assistant director 

 Daughters (1997)

Discography

Studio albums

Awards

Education

André attended film school at San Francisco State University where he graduated and joined fellow sound engineer, Richard Hymns as an apprentice for the film The Meteor Man but he states “the early turning point in his career was being offered a position on the crew for Jurassic Park.

Influences

In a 2021 interview with cinemotage, André states fellow artists, Paul Robeson, Gordon Parks, Melvin Van Peebles, and Spike Lee amongst his influences. He also cites mentors, Richard Hymns and Frank Eulner amongst such. Films that inspired André to pursue a career in film include, “Buck and the Preacher,” “Shaft,” and “Do The Right Thing.”

Personal life
André is the brother of birth educator and doula Deundra Hundon.

References

Year of birth missing (living people)
Living people